The Blancheville Monster, released in the UK and Italy as Horror, is a 1963 horror film  directed by Alberto de Martino. The film's script by Gianni Grimaldi and Bruno Corbucci is promoted as being based on the works of Edgar Allan Poe, but actually only borrows elements from the short stories "The Fall of the House of Usher", "A Tale of the Ragged Mountains" and "Some Words with a Mummy". Long after its release, director Alberto de Martino described his film as "a little film of no importance".

Plot
Emilie De Blancheville returns to her family's castle and finds things have drastically changed. Her brother Roderic is now in charge of the estate. The servants have all died and been replaced by new staff members who are cold and unfamiliar. Her father, Count Blancheville, has been horribly disfigured and lives secluded in one of the castle's isolated towers. The Count believes the Blanchevilles are under a family curse, which can only be lifted if Emilie dies before her 21st birthday, five days away. When the Count escapes from the tower, Emily realizes her life is in danger.

Cast
 Gérard Tichy - Rodéric De Blancheville
 Leo Anchóriz - Doctor LaRouche
 Ombretta Colli (as Joan Hills) - Emilie De Blancheville 
 Helga Liné - Miss Eleanore
 Irán Eory - Alice Taylor
 Vanni Materassi (as Richard Davis) - John Taylor
 Paco Morán (as Frank Moran) - Alistair

Production
Spanish sources for the production credit Natividad Zaro as a contributor to the script. As with many European co-productions of the era, this was done for tax reasons. Italian promotional material for the film promoted it as a product based on an Edgar Allan Poe story, but the film only borrows elements from "The Fall of the House of Usher", "A Tale of the Ragged Mountains" and "Some Words with a Mummy". The film's style is closer to that of a Roger Corman film rather than the Italian gothic horror films of era. Director Alberto de Martino felt he was more inspired by Alfred Hitchcock.

The film was shot at Monastery of Santa Maria La Real de Valdeiglesias in Spain and at Cinecittà in Rome.

Release
The Blancheville Monster was released in Italy on June 6, 1963 through Titanus. It was released in Italy under the title Horror as chosen by producer Italo Zingarelli. The film grossed 87 million Italian lira on its initial theatrical run in Italy.

Home media
The film is in public domain in the United States. On March 23, 2004, it was released on DVD by Alpha Video. Alpha Video would also re-release the film on April 8, 2009 as part of its Gothic Horror Movie Pack. It was later released by Mill Creek Entertainment on August 30, 2005, as part of its Chilling Classics DVD. Mill Creek would re-release the film on August 19, 2008 as part of its Tales of Horror Collection. On August 30, 2007, it was released by Direct Source as part of its Monster Mash Movie Pack. On August 24, the following year, it was released by TNT Media Group. It was last released by Retro Media on November 19, 2013 as a part of its 50th Anniversary Edgar Allan Poe's Horror Pack.

Arrow Films would release it on a Bluray boxset along with three other gothic films in October 2022 in UK.

Reception
Alberto de Martino referred to his own film as "a little film of no importance" and that the only thing he found memorable was the mask used in the film, which was sculpted by his father. Roberto Curti, author of Italian Gothic Horror Films, 1957-1969 (2015) stated that the film "does not have much to offer" outside de Martino's competent directing and Alejandro Ulloa's lighting. Curti also noted the plot's cliches and mediocre acting. Bartłomiej Paszylk, author of The Pleasure and Pain of Cult Horror Films referred to the film as one of the brighter moments of Alberto de Martino's career and that "neither the overacting nor the many flaws of the script can take away the pleasure of watching The Blancheville Monster".

See also
 List of horror films of 1963
 List of Italian films of 1963
 List of Spanish films of 1963

References

Notes

Bibliography

External links
 
 
 
 

Italian horror films
Spanish monster movies
Italian black-and-white films
Spanish black-and-white films
Films set in castles
Films shot in Rome
Films shot in Spain
Films directed by Alberto De Martino
Gothic horror films
1960s Italian films